The Lord of Knapdale was a title for the lord of Knapdale, Scotland in High Medieval Scotland.

Lords of Knapdale

Suibhne MacDunslebh
Dubhghall mac Suibhne ??–1262
Walter Stewart, Earl of Menteith 1262–
John de Menteith
John Monteith

References
Paul, James Balfour; The Scots Peerage, Vol. I, (Edinburgh, 1909)

Knapdale